Lymphoid enhancer-binding factor 1 (LEF1) is a protein that in humans is encoded by the LEF1 gene. It's a member of T cell factor/lymphoid enhancer factor (TCF/LEF) family.

Function 

Lymphoid enhancer-binding factor-1 (LEF1) is a 48-kD nuclear protein that is expressed in pre-B and T cells. It binds to a functionally important site in the T-cell receptor-alpha (TCRA) enhancer and confers maximal enhancer activity. LEF1 belongs to a family of regulatory proteins that share homology with high mobility group protein-1 (HMG1).

Clinical significance 

LEF1 is highly overexpressed and associated with disease progression and poor prognosis in B-cell chronic lymphocytic leukemia and other kinds of malignancies like colorectal cancer. It is also a promising potential drug target.

Interactions 

Lymphoid enhancer-binding factor 1 has been shown to interact with:
 ALX4,
 AML-1,
 Catenin beta-1/β-catenin/CTNNB1, including transgenically,
 EP300,
 MITF 
 PIAS4,
 SMAD2, and
 SMAD3.

References

Further reading

External links 
 

Transcription factors